Helge Pedersen (born c. 1955) is a long-distance motorcyclist originally from Kristiansand, Norway, who now resides in Seattle, Washington. He traveled more than  touring the world on a BMW R80G/S adventure touring motorcycle between 1982 and 1992. This journey is recounted in his book 10 Years on 2 Wheels. The motorcycle he rode on was placed on display at the BMW Museum in Munich.

Pedersen has been "prominent in the motorcycle industry", continuing to ride and lead tours since 1993. For example, he led three  trips to Tierra del Fuego by 2013.

He started a motorcycle touring company in his city of residence, Seattle in 1998, and has published a series of instructional and adventure documentary DVDs.

Bibliography/filmography

GlobeRiders documentary DVD series
Africa Adventure  (2011)
Eurasian Odyssey  (2009)
IndoChina Expedition  (2008)
Silk Road Adventure  (2007)
Iceland Expedition  (2006)
GlobeRiders instructional DVD series: BMW F800GS Adventure Touring Instructional DVD, BMW R1200GS Adventure Touring Instructional DVD, BMW R1100GS/1150GS Adventure Touring Instructional DVD, BMW F650GS Adventure Touring Instructional DVD

References

Further reading

BMW R1200GS Adventure build, Ultimate Motorcycling

Long-distance motorcycle riders
Businesspeople from Seattle
Writers from Seattle
American travel writers
American male non-fiction writers
American documentary filmmakers
Motorcycle tour guides
Motorcycle touring writers
1950s births
Living people
People from Kristiansand
Norwegian emigrants to the United States